Pascall has several meaning including:
 Pascall (company), an Australian and New Zealand confectionery company
 Pascall Prize
 Pascall, another name for the Monica (grape)

People 
Alex Pascall
Geraldine Pascall
Jeremy Pascall

See also
Pascal (disambiguation)